Jennifer Symon (born 7 December 1953) is a former athletics competitor from South Australia. During the 1974 British Commonwealth Games in Christchurch, she won a silver medal in the javelin throw, and also competed in the high jump event.

References

1953 births
Living people
20th-century Australian women
21st-century Australian women
21st-century Australian people
Athletes (track and field) at the 1974 British Commonwealth Games
Australian female high jumpers
Australian female javelin throwers
Commonwealth Games silver medallists for Australia
Sportswomen from South Australia
Commonwealth Games medallists in athletics
Medallists at the 1974 British Commonwealth Games